The 1977 Tournament Players Championship was a golf tournament in Florida on the PGA Tour, held  at Sawgrass Country Club in Ponte Vedra Beach, southeast of Jacksonville. The fourth Tournament Players Championship, it was the first of five consecutive at Sawgrass, which had agreed a multi-year with the PGA Tour in 1976.

Mark Hayes was the champion in windy conditions at 289 (+1), two strokes ahead of runner-up  McCullough and Tom Watson were the co-leaders after the third round, with Hayes  Defending champion Jack Nicklaus finished four strokes back, in a tie for fifth place.

Bob Menne set the tour's 72-hole record for fewest putts with 99, but tied for 47th at 303 (+15). The record had been 102 putts, by Bert Yancey in 1966 at his victory in the final Portland Open Invitational.

Venue

This was the first of five Tournament Players Championships held at Sawgrass Country Club; it moved to the nearby TPC at Sawgrass Stadium Course in 1982.  The venues for the first three editions in Georgia, Texas, and south Florida were familiar to most of the participants as those courses had recently hosted multiple PGA Tour events; this was the first tour event at Sawgrass.

Past champions in the field

Made the cut 

Source:

Missed the cut

Round summaries

First round
Thursday, March 17, 1977

Source:

Second round
Friday, March 18, 1977

Source:

Third round
Saturday, March 19, 1977

Source:

Final round
Sunday, March 20, 1977

Source:

References

External links
The Players Championship website

1977
1977 in golf
1977 in American sports
1977 in sports in Florida
March 1977 sports events in the United States